The Bréguet Br 902 Cinzano was a French training glider produced in the 1950s by Société anonyme des Ateliers d'aviation Louis Bréguet

Design and development
In response to a need for replacing the Caudron C.800 training glider with a contemporary high performance trainer, Bréguet designed and built the Br 902 Cinzano prototype, with parts in common with the Br 901 and Br 904. Production aircraft would have been optimised for production and also used new manufacturing techniques, particularly for the wings, which were intended to be built using the hollow shell method; high-accuracy plywood skins laid up in jig moulds with structure added in the mould to retain the high accuracy surfaces.

Construction was of welded steel tube for the fuselage with wood for wings and empennage. The fuselage was covered in fabric, with plywood for areas requiring more resilience. Flying controls, wings and empennage were built up from wood with plywood high strength members, covered with fabric. The instructor and pupil sat in closed tandem cockpits covered with Plexiglass canopies. Control was via conventional ailerons, elevators, operated by rods and rudder operated by cables, with airbrakes on the wings for approach control. The undercarriage consisted of a single mainwheel fitted with a hydraulic brake, rubber sprung tail-skid, with protection skids on the wing-tips.

The first prototype, Br 902-01, flew for the first time on 14 May 1957 piloted by  Paul Lepanse, but despite good performance and flying characteristics, the Br 902 failed to sell well; only a small production run of 6 gliders was built.

Specifications (Br 902)

References

Bibliography

1950s French sailplanes
 0902
Aircraft first flown in 1957
Glider aircraft
Shoulder-wing aircraft